Kintbury railway station serves the village of Kintbury in Berkshire, England.

The station has a level crossing at its western end, controlled from a nearby crossing box that also remotely supervises the ones at Hamstead and Hungerford (though this will eventually be abolished and control transferred to the Thames Valley ROC at Didcot by CCTV).

Services

Trains call hourly each way (with peak extras) on weekdays and Saturdays and every two hours on Sundays. Some early morning and mid/late evening trains only run as far as Reading.

References

External links

Railway stations in Berkshire
DfT Category F1 stations
Former Great Western Railway stations
Railway stations in Great Britain opened in 1847
Railway stations served by Great Western Railway
1847 establishments in England
Kintbury